The 2022–23 Georgia Lady Bulldogs basketball represents the University of Georgia in the 2022–23 college basketball season. Led by first year head coach Katie Abrahamson-Henderson, the team plays their games at Stegeman Coliseum and are members of the Southeastern Conference.

Schedule and results

|-
!colspan=12 style=|Non-conference regular season

|-
!colspan=12 style=|SEC regular season

|-
!colspan=9 style=| SEC Tournament

|-
!colspan=9 style=| NCAA tournament

Rankings

See also
 2022–23 Georgia Bulldogs basketball team

References

Georgia Lady Bulldogs basketball seasons
Georgia
Georgia Lady Bulldogs
Georgia Lady Bulldogs
Georgia